Natasha D'Schommer is a photographer in Minneapolis, Minnesota, known for photographing rare books and manuscripts.

D'Schommer was born in Minneapolis in 1972. "She graduated from New England College in West Sussex, England, with a degree in English literature, and completed a Master of Fine Arts degree at Vermont College of Fine Arts."

D'Schommer was a 2005 recipient of the McKnight Photography Fellowship. D'Schommer photographs rare books and musical manuscripts, including Ludwig van Beethoven’s sketchbooks (1815), the Gutenberg Bible (1455), J.S. Bach's Cantata No. 33, and original copies of all of the first four printed Bibles as well as copy of the Qur'an from about 1700.

References

External links 
 D'Schommer's website
 D'Schommer's website for Biblio Collection
 Ashle Briggs Horton, "Artist's Corner: Q&A with Natasha D’Schommer", Southwest Minneapolis Patch, February 18, 2011.

Living people
1972 births
American photographers
New England College alumni
Vermont College of Fine Arts alumni
American women photographers
People from Minneapolis
21st-century American women